Bob Lloyd Schieffer (born February 25, 1937) is an American television journalist. He is known for his moderation of presidential debates, where he has been praised for his capability. Schieffer is one of the few journalists to have covered all four of the major Washington national assignments: the White House, the Pentagon, United States Department of State, and United States Congress. His career with CBS has almost exclusively dealt with national politics. He has interviewed every United States President since Richard Nixon, as well as most of those who sought the office.

Schieffer has been with CBS News since 1969, serving as the anchor on the Saturday edition of CBS Evening News for 20 years, from 1976 to 1996, as well as the Chief Washington Correspondent from 1982 until 2015, and moderator of the Sunday public affairs show, Face the Nation, from 1991 until May 31, 2015. From March 10, 2005, to August 31, 2006, Schieffer was interim weekday anchor of CBS Evening News, and was one of the primary substitutes for Katie Couric and Scott Pelley.

Following his retirement from Face the Nation, Schieffer has continued to work for CBS as a contributor, making many appearances on air giving political commentary covering the 2016 presidential election. Schieffer is currently releasing episodes of a new podcast, "Bob Schieffer's 'About the News' with H. Andrew Schwartz".

Schieffer has written three books about his career in journalism: Face the Nation: My Favorite Stories from the First 50 Years of the Award-Winning News Broadcast, This Just In: What I Couldn't Tell You on TV, and Bob Schieffer's America.  He co-authored a book about Ronald Reagan, The Acting President, with Gary Paul Gates, that was published in 1989. In his memoir, This Just In, Schieffer credits the fact he was a beat reporter at CBS for his longevity at the network.

Schieffer has won virtually every award in broadcast journalism, including eight Emmys, the overseas Press Club Award, the Paul White Award presented by the TV News Directors Association, and the Edward R. Murrow Award given by Murrow's alma mater, Washington State University.

Shieffer was inducted into the Broadcasting & Cable Hall of Fame in 2002, and inducted into the National Academy of Arts and Sciences Hall of Fame in 2013. He was named a living legend by the Library of Congress in 2008.

Schieffer is currently serving as the Walter Shorenstein Media and Democracy Fellow at Harvard Kennedy School's Shorenstein Center.

Early life
Schieffer was born on February 25, 1937, in Austin, Texas, to John Emmitt Schieffer and Gladys Payne Schieffer, and grew up in Fort Worth, Texas. He is an alumnus of North Side High School, and received a B.A. in journalism and English in 1959 from  Texas Christian University (TCU). In university he was a member of the Air Force Reserve Officer Training Corps and the Phi Delta Theta fraternity. The College of Communication at TCU was renamed in Bob Schieffer's honor in 2013.

Early career

After graduating from TCU, Schieffer served in the United States Air Force for three years as a public information officer stationed at Travis Air Force Base and later McChord Air Force Base. He was honorably discharged and joined the Fort Worth Star-Telegram as a reporter, with one of his key assignments being a trip to Vietnam to profile soldiers from the Fort Worth area. Schieffer was the first reporter from a Texas newspaper who reported from Vietnam.

It was at the Star Telegram that he received his first major journalistic recognition when John Kennedy was assassinated in Dallas on November 22, 1963. Shortly after President Kennedy was shot in Dallas, Texas, Schieffer was in the Star-Telegram office and received a telephone call from a woman in search of a ride to Dallas. The woman was Marguerite Oswald, Lee Harvey Oswald's mother, whom he accompanied to the Dallas police station, where he spent the next several hours. In the company of Oswald's mother, Marguerite, and his wife, Marina, he was able to use the phone in the police station to call in dispatches from other Star-Telegram reporters in the building. This enabled the Star-Telegram to create four "Extra" editions on the day of the assassination. Schieffer later joined the Star-Telegram'''s television station, WBAP-TV in Fort Worth, before taking a job with CBS in 1969.

CBS Broadcasting career
Schieffer was anchor of the CBS Sunday Night News from 1973 to 1974, the CBS Sunday Evening News in 1976, and of the Saturday Evening News broadcast for twenty years from 1976 until 1996. He also anchored the weekday CBS morning show at the time called "Morning", which was titled in accordance to the day of the week (Monday Morning, Tuesday Morning, etc.) from 1979 to 1980. One of his best known roles was as moderator of the Sunday public affairs show, Face the Nation, from 1991 until May 31, 2015.

Schieffer was also known for his reporting duties.  Between 1970 and 1974, he was assigned to the Pentagon. From 1974 to 1979, he was the White House correspondent for CBS, and in 1982 he became Chief Washington Correspondent, in addition to his anchor duties.

In the wake of Dan Rather's controversial retirement,Telling It Slant Slate, November 24, 2004 he was named interim anchor for the weekday CBS Evening News. He assumed that job on March 10, 2005, the day following Rather's last broadcast.

Under Schieffer, the CBS Evening News gained about 200,000 viewers, to average 7.7 million viewers, reversing some of the decline in ratings that occurred during Rather's tenure; while NBC Nightly News was down by 700,000 viewers, and ABC's World News Tonight lost 900,000. Schieffer closed the gap with ABC's World News Tonight when co-anchor Bob Woodruff was injured in late January 2006.

Schieffer made his last CBS Evening News broadcast on August 31, 2006, and was replaced by Katie Couric. On Couric's second broadcast, he returned to provide segments for the evening news as chief Washington correspondent. Schieffer was also a substitute anchor for Couric and Scott Pelley when he became anchor of the evening news in June 2011.

On October 13, 2004, Schieffer was the moderator of the third presidential debate between President George W. Bush and Senator John Kerry in Tempe, Arizona. On October 15, 2008, Schieffer moderated the third presidential debate between Senator Barack Obama and Senator John McCain at Hofstra University in Uniondale, New York. Schieffer also moderated the third debate of the presidential candidates in 2012, between President Obama and former Massachusetts Governor Mitt Romney, on October 22, in Boca Raton, Florida.

In 2013, Schieffer won the National Association of Broadcasters Distinguished Service Award and the Walter Cronkite Award for Excellence in Journalism.

Retirement from broadcasting

On April 8, 2015, Schieffer announced his intention to retire as host of Face the Nation while speaking at his alma mater, Texas Christian University. Schieffer departed after working in journalism for 52 years, 46 of those years with CBS.  On the April 12 broadcast of the program, he announced that John Dickerson, the political director for CBS, would succeed him, beginning in June 2015.

As he prepared to retire from Face The Nation, Schieffer reflected on the acclaim that came his way during the latter stages of his career. "The interesting thing about my life — a lot of the recognition I got was after most people retired," he told The New York Times, going on to add, "I think that people just became familiar with me just because I had been there and others had come and gone."

Schieffer's final broadcast as moderator of Face the Nation was on May 31, 2015.

Singing career
Since leaving the anchor desk at CBS Evening News in 2006, Schieffer has entertained his longstanding interest in songwriting by collaborating with musicians in New York and Washington, D.C. His latest efforts have resulted in four songs with the Washington area band, Honky Tonk Confidential, all of which appear on their CD, Road Kill Stew and Other News (with Special Guest Bob Schieffer). Schieffer sings "TV Anchorman", and wrote the lyrics for the other songs.

Personal life

Schieffer married Patricia Penrose in 1967; they have two daughters and three granddaughters.

Schieffer is the older brother of Tom Schieffer, a friend and former business partner of President George W. Bush, who was appointed U.S. Ambassador to Australia from 2001 to 2005 by President Bush, and served as U.S. Ambassador to Japan from 2005 through 2009. On March 2, 2009, Tom Schieffer announced he was forming an exploratory committee that will allow him to seek the Democratic nomination for Governor of Texas.

Schieffer has a sister, Sharon Schieffer Mayes, who is a retired teacher and school administrator who taught science for 17 years before becoming the Vice Principal of Dunbar High School in Fort Worth, Texas. Sharon Mayes eventually became the high school principal at Keller High School at a time when only 2 percent of the principals in the largest high schools in Texas were women.

Schieffer is a survivor of grade III bladder cancer. He was diagnosed in 2003 and has been cancer-free since 2004. He has been diagnosed as having type 2 diabetes, and is on insulin therapy.

Popular culture

After fellow CBS newscaster and Texan Dan Rather was switched from the White House beat to hosting the documentary show, CBS Reports, in 1974, the October 13, 1974, edition of the Doonesbury comic strip featured a joking fantasy scene in which Schieffer, his successor, haltingly comments on the transition: "It was the affiliatesthey just couldn't take him. I mean let's face it, Dan wasn't exactly MR. TACT!. I dunno.... Maybe it's just as well in the long run, I mean, you know? Anyway, this is Robert Schieffer at the White House...." (Schieffer notes that "The strip was right on except for one thing. My real name is Bob, not Robert").

Schieffer had a cameo appearance beside Harrison Ford in the 2010 film, Morning Glory, along with his CBS News colleague Morley Safer as well as MSNBC's Chris Matthews.
He also had a cameo appearance on television series Madam Secretary  in the episode named "Face of Nation".

Career timeline
 1973–1974: CBS Sunday Night News anchor
 1973–1996: 60 Minutes contributor
 1973–2005: CBS Evening News anchor (summer and weekend editions)
 1982 – 2015: CBS News Chief Washington correspondent
 May 1991 – May 31, 2015: Face the Nation moderator
 March 10, 2005 – August 31, 2006: CBS Evening News anchor
 2016–present: CBS News  contributor <ref
name=autogenerated1 />

 Publications 
 Good Show, President Reagan: The Acting President (1989) with Gary Paul Gates
 This Just In: What I Couldn’t Tell You on TV (2003)
 Face the Nation: My Favorite Stories from the First 50 Years of the Award-Winning News Broadcast (2004)
 Bob Schieffer's America (2008)
 Overload: Finding the Truth in Today's Deluge of News'' (2017) with H. Andrew Schwartz

See also 

 New Yorkers in journalism

References

External links

 Bob Schieffer School of Journalism Texas Christian University
 Bob Schieffer And Bladder Cancer: A Survivor's Story RevolutionHealth.com, July 15, 2008
 InnerVIEWS with Ernie Manouse: Bob Schieffer (TV Interview) Google Videos
 Stephen Colbert Interview Comedy Central, March 6, 2006
 Biography – Bob Schieffer CBS News
 

 

American television news anchors
American television reporters and correspondents
American war correspondents
1937 births
Living people
CBS News people
Fort Worth Star-Telegram people
Journalists from Texas
Writers from Austin, Texas
People from Fort Worth, Texas
Military personnel from Texas
Texas Christian University alumni
United States Air Force officers
20th-century American journalists
American male journalists
21st-century American journalists
60 Minutes correspondents